Kanchanpur may refer to:

 Kanchanpur, Bihar, Bihta, Bihar, India
 Kanchanpur, Gujarat, India
 Kanchanpur, North Tripura, North Tripura, India
 Kanchanpur, Rohtas, India
 Kanchanpur, Bankura, West Bengal, India
 Kanchanpur, Unnao, a village in Uttar Pradesh, India
 Kanchanpur District, Nepal
 Kanchanpur Union, a Union council of Basail Upazila, Bangladesh

See also 
 Kanchanrup